William Joseph James "Doc" Carson (November 25, 1899 – May 29, 1967) was a Canadian professional ice hockey forward who played 159 games in the National Hockey League between 1926 and 1930. Born in Bracebridge, Ontario, he played for the Toronto Maple Leafs and Boston Bruins. He won the Stanley Cup in 1929 with the Boston Bruins, scoring the game-winning goal in the team's 2-1 win at Madison Square Garden against the New York Rangers. Bill was one of three Carson brothers to play in the NHL, along with younger brothers Gerry and Frank.

In 2003, Bill Carson was inducted into the Bobby Orr Hall of Fame in Parry Sound.

Career statistics

Regular season and playoffs

References

External links

1899 births
1967 deaths
Boston Bruins players
Canadian ice hockey forwards
Ice hockey people from Ontario
London Tecumsehs players
New Haven Eagles players
Ontario Hockey Association Senior A League (1890–1979) players
People from Bracebridge, Ontario
Stanley Cup champions
Toronto Maple Leafs players
Toronto Varsity Blues ice hockey players